The 2009–10 Iowa Hawkeyes women's basketball team represented the University of Iowa in the 2009–10 NCAA Division I women's basketball season. The Hawkeyes are members of the Big Ten Conference.

Offseason
May 5: The University of Iowa women's basketball team hosted Boston College as part of the third annual Big Ten/ACC Challenge. The game was held at Carver-Hawkeye Arena on Dec. 2. This was to be the first-ever meeting between Iowa and Boston College. Overall, Iowa is 9–4 against teams from the ACC.

Exhibition

Regular season
The Hawkeyes will host the KCRG-TV9 Hawkeye Challenge from November 14–15. Illinois State, UCLA and Santa Clara are the other teams. From November 27–28, the Hawkeyes will compete in the Nugget Classic. The Hy-Vee Cy-Hawk Series will resume against Iowa State on December 10.

Roster

Schedule

Player stats

Postseason

Big Ten tournament
Iowa went into the 2009–2010 Big Ten Tournament with a 17–12 (9–8) record and was seeded 3rd.

NCAA basketball tournament
Iowa was invited to the 2009–2010 NCAA Division I women's basketball tournament.  They were seeded 8th in the Sacramento Division

Awards and honors

Team players drafted into the WNBA

See also
2009–10 Big Ten women's basketball season

References

External links
Official Site

Iowa Hawkeyes women's basketball seasons
Iowa
Iowa
Iowa Hawkeyes
Iowa Hawkeyes